WXKU 92.7 FM is a radio station broadcasting a country music format. Licensed to Austin, Indiana, the station serves the areas of Seymour, Indiana, Scottsburg, Indiana, and North Vernon, Indiana, and is owned by BK Media, LLC.

References

External links

XKU